The Correction Officers' Benevolent Association (COBA) is the second largest trade union for law enforcement in New York.  COBA is also the largest municipal jail union in the United States. It represents corrections staff within the New York City Department of Correction run by the New York City Department of Correction. It has a membership of 9000.

Notworthy Decisions 
 COBA  was able to get personal protection equipment for their officers during the COVID-19 pandemic.
 Criticized NYC Government for their reaction to COVID 19
 Fought to Bar Visitors to Rikers Island during COVID 19.
 President Benny Boscio, fought to maintain Solitary Confinement and keep Rikers Island Open as a jail.
 COBA endorsed Barack Obama for President in 2008.
Pushed through the "Feces Bill" which made it a felony to throw feces at a Corrections Officer.
Key in getting corrections officers attaining parity with the NYPD and the FDNY in pay and benefits.

Presidents

Benny Boscio Jr. (2020 to Present)

Elias Husamudeen (2016 to 2020)

Norman Seabrook  (1995-2016) 

Stanley Israel  (?-1995)

Phil Seelig (1979-?)

Donald J Cranston (1976-1977)

Harold Brown (1974-?)

Congressman Leo Zeferetti (1968-1974) 

John A. Martine (1966)

Stephen Hartigan

Other Leadership 
Anthony S. Seminerio

References

External links
 COBA official site.

updated article 

Jails in the United States
Legal organizations based in the United States
Jails in New York City
Law enforcement in New York City
1901 establishments in New York City
Prison officer organisations
Prisons in the United States
Prisons in New York City
Trade unions established in 1901
Organizations based in New York City
Trade unions in New York (state)
New York City Department of Correction